Michael Ryan (born 9 May 1981) is an Australian former rugby league footballer who played as a  for the Brisbane Broncos in the Australian National Rugby League competition.

Background
Ryan was born in Brisbane, Queensland, Australia.

Career playing statistics

Point scoring summary

Matches played

External links
Michael Ryan Official NRL Profile

1981 births
Living people
Australian rugby league players
Brisbane Broncos players
Rugby league hookers
Rugby league players from Brisbane
Toowoomba Clydesdales players